Noxubee County is a county located in the U.S. state of Mississippi. As of the 2020 census, its population was 10,285. Its county seat is Macon. The name is derived from the Choctaw word nakshobi meaning "to stink".

Geography

Major highways
  U.S. Highway 45
  Mississippi Highway 14
  Mississippi Highway 21
  Mississippi Highway 39

Adjacent counties
 Lowndes County (north)
 Pickens County, Alabama (east)
 Sumter County, Alabama (southeast)
 Kemper County (south)
 Winston County (west)
 Oktibbeha County (northwest)

National protected area
 Noxubee National Wildlife Refuge (part)

Demographics

2020 census

As of the 2020 United States Census, 10,285 people, 3,986 households, and 2,592 families were residing in the county.

2010 census
As of the 2010 United States Census, 11,545 people lived in the county; 71.6% were African American, 27.1% White, 0.2% Asian, 0.2% Native American, 0.4% of some other race, and 0.5% of two or more races, and 0.8% were Hispanic or Latino (of any race).

2000 census
As of the census of 2000, 12,548 people, 4,470 households, and 3,222 families were living in the county. The population density was 18 people per square mile (7/km2). The 5,228 housing units had an average density of 8 per square mile (3/km2). The racial makeup of the county was 69.30% Black, 29.49% White,  0.15% Native American, 0.11% Asian, 0.37% from other races, and 0.58% from two or more races. About 1.12% of the population were Hispanics or Latinos of any race.

Of the 4,470 households, 35.8% had children under 18 living with them, 43.0% were married couples living together, 24.7% had a female householder with no husband present, and 27.9% were not families. About 25.9% of all households were made up of individuals, and 11.5% had someone living alone who was 65  or older.  The average household size was 2.77, and the average family size was 3.36.

In the county, the age distribution was 30.7% under 18, 10.3% from 18 to 24, 26.7% from 25 to 44, 19.5% from 45 to 64, and 12.8% who were 65 or older. The median age was 32 years. For every 100 females, there were 90.50 males. For every 100 females 18 and over, there were 84.60 males.

The median income for a household in the county was $22,330, and for a family was $27,312. Males had a median income of $25,008 versus $17,636 for females. The per capita income for the county was $12,018. About 29.20% of families and 32.80% of the population were below the poverty line, including 43.60% of those under age 18 and 25.30% of those age 65 or over.

Politics

Noxubee County is solidly Democratic in modern presidential elections, having last voted for the Republican presidential candidate in 1972. Ironically, however, in the 1964 election it gave 96.6% of the vote to Republican Barry Goldwater, a total no candidate of either party has surpassed in any county in any subsequent presidential election. This was likely because this was the last election before the Voting Rights Act enfranchised the African-American majority in Noxubee County, and the white minority fiercely opposed the pro-civil rights President Johnson.

Education
Public elementary and secondary education is administered by the Noxubee County School District, which includes the entire county.

Noxubee County is within the service area of the East Mississippi Community College system. The system offers classes in the Macon Extension at Noxubee County High School in Macon.

At one time, many more schools existed within the county. In the early 20th century, 19 of these were consolidated into two districts consisting of six schools, which were Salem, Lynn Creek, Center Point, Cliftonville, Cooksville-Paulette, Mashulaville, and Brooksville. The old Salem School was added to the National Register of Historic Places in 1989. The Noxubee County Agricultural School at Mashulaville opened in 1910 and included a 40-acre farm and provided living arrangements for up to 40 boarding students.

The public school population is 1% White, compared to 27% of the county population. Central Academy in Macon, which was founded in 1968 as a segregation academy, closed in 2017. In 1982, private deals that had been made between board members to use public funds to aid Central Academy became public. As a result, the NAACP called for the resignation of all Noxubee county school board members who had knowledge of the board's aid to Central Academy, which at the time did not enroll any black students.

United States v. Ike Brown

In 2005, the U.S. Department of Justice began an investigation and the following year filed suit under the Voting Rights Act alleging that the chairman of the Noxubee County Democratic Party, Ike Brown, had conspired to orchestrate "relentless racial discrimination" against White voters.

The court ruled that Brown, in conjunction with the Noxubee Democratic Executive Committee, had "manipulated the political process in ways specifically intended and designed to impair and impede participation of White voters and to dilute their votes". This was the first time the Voting Rights Act of 1965 had been used to allege discrimination against Whites.

Communities

City
 Macon

Towns
 Brooksville
 Shuqualak

Unincorporated communities
 Bigbee Valley
 Gholson
 Mashulaville
 Paulette
 Prairie Point

See also
 National Register of Historic Places listings in Noxubee County, Mississippi
 Noxubee National Wildlife Refuge

References

 
Mississippi counties
Mississippi placenames of Native American origin
Counties of Appalachia
1833 establishments in Mississippi
Populated places established in 1833
Black Belt (U.S. region)
Majority-minority counties in Mississippi